"People Help the People" is the second single taken from Cherry Ghost's début album, Thirst for Romance. It was made available to download on 11 June 2007, and followed two weeks later on CD and 7-inch vinyl. The band played the song live on Later... with Jools Holland on 24 November 2006. Jimi Goodwin of the band Doves plays drums on the single. "People Help the People" peaked the UK Singles Chart at number 27. The song was also a hit in Italy.

The song was written in Aldred's childhood box room bedroom in Bolton in the run upto Xmas 2005 

Two music videos were produced for the song, one directed by Huse Monfaradi, the other one directed by Chris Hopewell.

Track listings
All songs written by Simon Aldred, except where noted.

CD (HVN168CD):
 "People Help the People" – 3:59
 "Four Eyes" – 4:47

7" vinyl (HVN168):
 "People Help the People" – 3:59
 "Please Come Home" (Aldred, Parsons, Rhodes) – 4:39

Download (UK iTunes only):
 "People Help the People" – 3:59
 "People Help the People" (Cowboys and Cosmonauts Remix) – 4:10

Weekly charts

Birdy version

English musician Birdy released a cover version of the song, which was released on 28 October 2011 as a download in the United Kingdom. In 2012, the song received attention in Australia when it was used in a trailer for a Neighbours storyline.

Music video
A music video to accompany the release of "People Help the People" was first released onto YouTube on 6 October 2011 at a total length of four minutes and eighteen seconds. It was shot in black and white, and it features Birdy walking through London. The video has amounted 100 million views as of June 2017. Another music video, released on YouTube 30 October 2012, was shot in France. It was directed by Florent Déchard.

Track listing

Weekly charts

Year-end charts

Certifications

Release history

References

External links
 People Help the People at Youtube

2007 singles
2011 singles
Heavenly Recordings singles
2007 songs
Songs written by Cherry Ghost
Cherry Ghost songs
Birdy (singer) songs
Folk ballads
Music videos directed by Adam Powell
Warner Records singles